Quintus Marcius Philippus (Quintus Marcius Q. f. Q. n. Philippus) was a Roman consul in 281 BC.

His father was probably Quintus Marcius Tremulus, consul in 306 and 288 BC. Instead of the cognomen Tremulus he took Philippus, which was further inherited by his descendants.

He was elected consul together with Lucius Aemilius Barbula. His victory over the Etruscans earned him a triumph on April 1 of that year.  In 269 BC he was elected censor together with his co-consul Lucius Aemilius Barbula. In 263 BC he was magister equitum to the dictator Gnaeus Fulvius Maximus Centumalus.

References

3rd-century BC Roman consuls
Roman censors
Quintus
3rd-century BC deaths
Year of birth unknown
Year of death uncertain